Natalia Bykova and Natalia Medvedeva were the defending champions but did not compete that year.

Belinda Cordwell and Elizabeth Smylie won in the final 6–7, 6–2, 6–1 against Ann Henricksson and Beth Herr.

Seeds
Champion seeds are indicated in bold text while text in italics indicates the round in which those seeds were eliminated.

 Belinda Cordwell /  Elizabeth Smylie (champions)
 Ann Henricksson /  Beth Herr (final)
 Louise Allen /  Iwona Kuczyńska (semifinals)
 Maria Lindström /  Heather Ludloff (semifinals)

Draw

External links
 1989 DHL Open Doubles Draw

Doubles
WTA Singapore Open
1989 in Singaporean sport